The Kali-Santarana Upanishad, also called , is a Sanskrit text. It is a minor Upanishad of Hinduism.

The Vaishnava Upanishad was likely composed before . According to Gaudiya Vaishnava tradition, this text's central mantra, known as the Hare Krishna, or Mahā ("Great"), Mantra, was given in the 16th century to Chaitanya Mahaprabhu at his initiation in Gaya (though the Sanskrit mantra is absent from his biographies).

This mantra, presented in two lines, contains the words Hare, Rama, and Krishna. The word Hare, meaning "O Harā" (the feminine counterpart to Vishnu, sometimes known as Hara), is repeated eight times, while the other two names are Hindu gods and are each repeated four times (or two forms of Vishnu, who is then invoked eight times as well). The text asserts that audible chanting of this mantra is a means to wash away all the tribulations of the current era (Kali Yuga).

Nomenclature
'Kali-Santarana Upanishad'  means to 'approach or set about crossing over quarrel, discord, and strife':

 'Kali' (Sanskrit कलि) means 'quarrel', 'contention', 'discord' or 'strife'. 
 Kali Yuga is the least-dharmic (e.g. least moral or religious) of the four cyclical yugas (ages or epochs) in Hindu cosmology.
 'Santarana' (Sanskrit सन्तरण) means "conveying over or across". 
 'Upanishad' (Sanskrit उपनिषद्) means 'approach' or 'set about'.

History

The text is one of the Vaishnava Upanishads, completed before about 1500 CE, and includes two verses called the Maha-mantra. The modern era Kali-Santarana Upanishad is the earliest known Hindu text where this widely known mantra appears. It was popularized by one of the Bhakti movement leaders Chaitanya Mahaprabhu in the 16th century. The Maha-mantra enunciated in this Upanishad is world-famous through the Hare Krishna (ISKCON) movement.

In Vaishnava etymology the word Hare refers to Hara (literally, captivating, carrying away), personifying goddess Radha who is the Shakti of Krishna ("nada shakti") or and remembers her as the one who stole the mind of Krishna. The word Hare, or Radha, is repeated eight times in the Kali-Santaraṇa mantra and is a reminder of her love for the divine Krishna. Popular in Gaudiya Vaishnavism denomination of Hinduism, its devotees assert that the effect of reciting this mantra in Kali-Santaraṇa text is to imbue the pleasure principle emanating from the very innermost part of one's being, feel transcendental ecstasy and revive deep consciousness, remembering the love of God, and to getting rid of the harmful influence of the Kali Yuga. The Gaudiya Vaishnava have traditionally asserted that this mantra should be recited audibly because the sound liberates the reciter and the listener.

In the anthology of 108 Upanishads of the Muktika canon, narrated by Rama to Hanuman, the Kali-Santarana Upanishad is listed at number 103.The Upanishad is not in the anthology of 52 popular Upanishads in north India by Colebrooke, nor is it found in the Bibliotheca Indica anthology of popular Upanishads in south India by Narayana.

Contents

At the end of the Dvapara Yuga (the third out of four yugas or epochs or eras, or ages, described in the scriptures of Hinduism), sage Narada approached Brahma and  requested him to enlighten him on the path he should follow to alleviate the detrimental effects of Kali Yuga. Brahma said that by way of taking the name of the supreme deity Narayana, all the tribulations of Kali yuga will be washed away. These sixteen names to be chanted are as:

When Sri Krishna Chaitanya Mahaprabhu promulgated the Mahamantra, it was rendered with Krishna's name's first.

Pronunciation of mantra in IPA (Sanskrit):

Chanting of the sixteen words mantra is asserted by the text to be constantly done by sage Narada, who with his musical instrument tanpura has been doing it for ages. Apart from this Upanishad, chanting of this mantra has also been prescribed in Puranas such as  Brahmananda Purana, the Agni Purana and so forth. In modern times, Lord Chaitanya who is believed by his followers to be the incarnation of Lord Krishna also preached chanting of this mantra with a change so that it can reach the mass public, putting Hare Krishna first and when chanted in a repeat mode, it has Krishna and Rama as starting node.

The Upanishad also states that in the Kali Yuga Narada was the creator or Kali-Karaka of all conflicts or undesirable acts. However, Narada who is the arbitrator of the laws of karma (all deeds) he himself approaches Brahma seeking redress to all the ills of this epoch. It is also stated in the Upanishad that Narada roamed around the world holding a lute in his hand to adjust the laws of harmony as a result of a curse by Daksha. The sixteen mantras that Narada was advised to recite by Brahma relate to jiva the immortal soul which has sixteen kalas.

There are no rules and regulations to chant this maha-mantra ('great mantra'). It should be chanted always irrespective of whether one is in a pure or impure condition.

Influence

The text has been influential on the Gaudiya Vaishnavism tradition, that grew in Gauda region of India in and near modern West Bengal, after it became the seat of Muslim power and Krishna devotees were forced into the service of Muslim officials.

From 16th-century onwards, in Gaudiya Vaishnavism, great importance has been given to public, vocal audible chanting or singing of the maha-mantra with the divine names of Hindu gods Krishna, Rama and goddess Radha (Hare). However, some other groups hold the view that chanting should be done silently or muttered in low-volume and would be equally effective. It was the view of Chaitanya and his disciples that chanting the name God's name (s) loudly would be most effective to obtain salvation and such a practice results in purifying the heart of both reciter and the listener, results in receiving the "love of God". This at least is the interpretation given in Rupa Goswami's Prathama Chaitanyaashtaka which states that Chaitanya himself had chanted this maha-mantra in a loud voice. For the Gaudiya Vaishnavas including ISKCON, the Hare Krishna maha-mantra also represents "transcendental sound" as the nature of the mantra is overwhelmingly qualified by Krishna and hence reciting it in "silence or in low volume" may not give the same effective feeling.

The 16th-century text Harinamarthah-ratna-dipika by Raghunatha dasa Goswami, gives the meaning of the maha-mantra where it is said that whenever Radha remembered Krishna and felt like being with him she chanted the maha-mantra; this made her feel closer to Krishna at the utterance of each syllable of the mantra.

The Maha-mantra of the Upanishad is part of the Gaudiya tradition legends, and the chant that was used to deconvert Muslims and initiate them to Vaishnavism in Bengal.

Chaitanya Mahaprabhu

In the biographies of Chaitanya Mahaprabhu, a Bhakti movement saint poet, the mantra he received when he was given diksha or initiation in Gaya was the maha-mantra of the Kali-Santarana Upanishad. In Gaudiya tradition, he is credited to have propagated it to the world along with Krishna bhakti.

Kali-Santaraṇa Upanishad is particularly revered by Gaudiya Vaishnavas, as the Hare Krishna The eight 'hare' syllables of the maha-mantra reach out to Radha that represents her eight facets of love for Krishna.

Temples
The three unique words in the maha-mantra found in Kali-Santarana Upanishad represent the three deities, and paintings of their love filled legends, found in Gaudiya Vaishnavism temples.

Namadwaar
“Nama Dwaar” is an initiative undertaken by the devotees of Chaitanya Mahaprabhu Nama Bhiksha Kendra, with the blessings of Sri Sri Muralidhara Swamiji, aimed at propagation of Nama Sankirtan of the Maha Mantra as the universal means of bringing about peace, prosperity and the feeling of universal brotherhood and providing material and spiritual upliftment to humanity at large.

In popular culture
The "Hare Krishna" mantra received the attention of George Harrison and John Lennon of the Beatles, and Harrison produced a 1969 recording of the mantra by devotees from the London Radha Krishna Temple. Titled "Hare Krishna Mantra", the song reached the top twenty on the UK music charts, and was also successful in West Germany and Czechoslovakia. The mantra of the Upanishad thus helped bring Bhaktivedanta and ISKCON ideas into the West. Kenneth Womack states that "Hare Krishna Mantra" became "a surprise number 12 hit" in Britain.

See also
Atmabodha Upanishad
Devi Upanishad
Maha Upanishad
Nirvana Upanishad

References

Bibliography

Further reading
 A sound recording of the Maha-mantra in Kali Santarana Upanishad, Universitat Pompeu Fabra, (Barcelona, Spain), 18 seconds
 Translated by K. Narayanasvami Aiyar
 Kali Santarana Upanishad,Translation and commentary by Swami Gaurangapada
 Kalisantaranaopanishad, Telugu Rendition
 Kalisantaranaopanishad, Sanskrit Rendition

Upanishads
Vaishnava texts